Kevin Lambert (born 1992) is a Canadian writer from Quebec. He is most noted for his novel Querelle de Roberval, which won the Prix Ringuet in 2019.

Originally from the Chicoutimi borough of Saguenay, Quebec, Lambert moved to Montreal in his late teens to study literature at the Université de Montréal. He published his debut novel Tu aimeras ce que tu as tué in 2017, and followed up with Querelle de Roberval in 2018. In addition to the Prix Ringuet, Querelle de Roberval won the Prix Sade and the Prix Oeuvre de la relève à Montréal.

Biblioasis has published English translations of both of his novels, with You Will Love What You Have Killed published in 2020, and Querelle of Roberval released in 2022.

Lambert is openly gay. Querelle de Roberval is partially based on Jean Genet's 1947 novel Querelle of Brest (Querelle de Brest).

References

1992 births
Living people
21st-century Canadian novelists
21st-century Canadian male writers
Canadian male novelists
Canadian novelists in French
French Quebecers
Canadian gay writers
Canadian LGBT novelists
Writers from Saguenay, Quebec
Université de Montréal alumni
Gay novelists
21st-century Canadian LGBT people